Yosef Sapir (January 27, 1902 – February 26, 1972) was an Israeli politician and Knesset member of the 1st to 7th Knessets. He served as head of the General Zionists and was a founding member of the Gahal party.

Sapir was born in Jaffa in 1902, then under the Ottoman Empire. Between 1940 and 1951 he served as the mayor of Petah Tikva, where a major street (part of Road 481) is named after him. Shortly after his tenure, at the end of 1952, Sapir joined the national government as Health Minister, later going on to become the Minister of Transportation between 1952 and 1955.

Sapir served as a Minister without Portfolio in Levi Eshkol's emergency government formed on the eve of the Six-Day War. He assumed the post of Minister of Trade and Industry in Golda Meir's government, until Gahal left the coalition on 6 August 1970.

Karmei Yosef, a community settlement founded in 1984 between Ramle and Beit Shemesh, is named in his honor.

External links

1902 births
1972 deaths
Burials at Segula Cemetery
Gahal politicians
General Zionists leaders
Jewish Israeli politicians
Jews in Mandatory Palestine
Jews in Ottoman Palestine
Liberal Party (Israel) politicians
Mayors of places in Israel
Members of the 1st Knesset (1949–1951)
Members of the 2nd Knesset (1951–1955)
Members of the 3rd Knesset (1955–1959)
Members of the 4th Knesset (1959–1961)
Members of the 5th Knesset (1961–1965)
Members of the 6th Knesset (1965–1969)
Members of the 7th Knesset (1969–1974)
Ministers of Health of Israel
Ministers of Transport of Israel
People from Jaffa
People from Petah Tikva
Politicians from Tel Aviv